Electoral results for the district of Mitchell may refer to:

 Electoral results for the district of Mitchell (South Australia)
 Electoral results for the district of Mitchell (Western Australia)